NZF may refer to:
 New Zealand First, a political party
 New Zealand Football, an association football organisation
 Nowhere-zero flow, a concept in graph theory